Robbe Decostere (born 8 May 1998) is a Belgian professional footballer who plays as a right back for Cercle Brugge in the Belgian First Division A.

Career
Decostere progressed through the youth teams of SVD Kortemark, Roeselare, Club Brugge before finally ending up in the youth academy of Cercle Brugge. In July 2018, he was promoted to the first team and signed his first professional contract alongside fellow youth prospect Charles Vanhoutte.

On 2 March 2019, manager Laurent Guyot gave Decostere his debut in the Belgian First Division A against Kortrijk. Fifteen minutes before full-time, Decostere came onto the pitch to replace the injured Guévin Tormin. In his first season, he made four appearances in the league.

On 1 September 2019, Decostere was sent on loan to Tubize together with teammate Charles Vanhoutte on a one-year deal. Decostere played regularly, but was unable to prevent the club from suffering relegation to the Belgian Division 2.

After his loan spell, Decostere became a permanent starter at Cercle Brugge, where he signed a contract extension until June 2023 in December 2020, just like fellow academy players Vanhoutte and Thibo Somers.

Career statistics

References

External links

1998 births
Living people
People from Kortemark
Belgian footballers
Association football defenders
Belgian Pro League players
K.S.V. Roeselare players
Club Brugge KV players
Cercle Brugge K.S.V. players
A.F.C. Tubize players
Belgian Third Division players
Footballers from West Flanders